Cẩm Thủy is a district (huyện) of Thanh Hóa province in the North Central Coast region of Vietnam.

As of 2003 the district had a population of 110,815. The district covers an area of 430 km². The district capital lies at Cẩm Thủy.

References

Districts of Thanh Hóa province